Inuyama may refer to:
Aoi Inuyama, a character in Laid-Back Camp
Inuko Inuyama, Japanese voice actor
Inuyama, Aichi, a Japanese city
Inuyama Castle, a castle in the city of Inuyama
Inuyama Station, a railway station in the city of Inuyama
Inuyama Bridge, a river connecting Aichi and Gifu Prefectures in Japan
Inuyama ware, an art style associated with the city of Inuyama
Inuyama Domain, a former Japanese feudal domain in what is now Aichi Prefecture